The Flag is a novel written by author and actor Robert Shaw.  It was published in 1965.  The Flag was the first in a trilogy of novels, to be followed by The Man in the Glass Booth (1967), and A Card from Morocco (1969).

1965 British novels
Chatto & Windus books